Jasna is a South Slavic female given name, derived from South Slavic jasno meaning clear, sharp. It is also found in Czech.

Nicknames are Jasnushka, Jasenka, Jasnenka, Jassie.

Name Days 
 Czech: 12 August or 30 January
 Slovene: 11 August or 17 August

Famous bearers 
 Jasna Diklic
 Jasna Djoković
 Jasna Đuričić
 Jasna Fazlić
 Jasna Kolar-Merdan
 Jasna Majstorović
 Jasna Matić
 Jasna Omejec
 Jasna Popovic
 Jasna Ptujec
 Jasna Samic
 Jasna Šekarić
 Jasna Tošković
 Jasna Veličković
 Jasna Zlokić, Croatian singer and actress
 Jasna Mark, Author and DJ

Fictional 
 Jasněnka, is a fictional character from the movie O princezně Jasněnce a létajícím ševci (1987). She was played by Michaela Kuklová.

See also 
 Slavic names

References

External links 
 Jasna -> Babynames.com

Feminine given names
Slavic feminine given names
Croatian feminine given names
Serbian feminine given names
Czech feminine given names
Macedonian feminine given names
Montenegrin feminine given names
Slovene feminine given names